The Pilgrim's Progress is a 1678 Christian allegorical novel by John Bunyan.

Pilgrim's Progress may also refer to:

The Pilgrim's Progress (opera), an opera by Ralph Vaughan Williams
The Pilgrim's Progress (film), a 2019 American animated film
Pilgrim's Progress: Journey to Heaven, a 2008 film based on the novel
Pilgrim's Progress (1978 film), a live-action film directed by Ken Anderson
The Pilgrims Progress (2017 film), a musical film based on the novel
Pilgrims Progress (album), the fourth studio album by Kula Shaker